Mechanicsville School may refer to:

Mechanicsville School (Norcross, Georgia), listed on the National Register of Historic Places in Gwinnett County, Georgia
Mechanicsville School (Philadelphia, Pennsylvania), listed on the National Register of Historic Places in Philadelphia County, Pennsylvania